Ursula Krechel (born 4 December 1947) is a German writer.

Krechel was born in Trier. From 1966 to 1972 she studied German studies, theatre, and art history at the University of Cologne. From 1969 to 1972, she worked as a drama advisor in Dortmund. After 1972, she lived in Frankfurt am Main for many years and now works in Berlin as a writer, focusing on Lyric poetry, but also writing prose, drama, and radio drama.

Works 
List obtained from Literatur Port.

Poetry

Novels and Stories

Essays and Criticism

Plays

Awards 
1980 Arbeitsstipendium for Berlin artists
1994 Internationaler Eifel-Literatur-Preis
1994 Martha-Saalfeld-Förderpreis
1997 
2006 Calwer Hermann-Hesse-Stipend
2008 Rheingau Literatur Preis for Shanghai fern von wo
2009 Jeanette Schocken Preis – Bremerhavener Bürgerpreis für Literatur
2009 Deutscher Kritikerpreis
2009 Joseph-Breitbach-Preis
2009 Kunstpreis Rheinland-Pfalz
2012 Wiesbaden Poetry Prize Orphil 
2012 German Book Prize

Notes

1947 births
Living people
People from Trier
German women poets
German women dramatists and playwrights
20th-century German dramatists and playwrights
21st-century German dramatists and playwrights
German Book Prize winners
21st-century German women writers
20th-century German women writers